Snoqualmie Casino is a casino in Snoqualmie, Washington owned by the Snoqualmie Indian Tribe. It opened on November 6, 2008. The  facility hosts 1,700 slots, 54 table games, 5 dining venues, an  entertainment venue and a sportsbook.

Gaming

Slots 
1,700 slot machines including Triple Fortune Dragon, 50 Lions, Aztec Fortune, etc.

Table Games 
54 table games including Blackjack, Craps, Roulette, Baccarat, etc.

Sportsbook 
On November 26, 2021 Snoqualmie's sportsbook was Washington's only sportsbook available until Angel of the Winds Casino in Arlington and Muckleshoot Casino in Auburn opened sportsbetting in subsequent months.

Awards 
 "Minority Business of the Year", Living Snoqualmie, 2019
 "Top 5 Places to Work in Washington", Living Snoqualmie, 2020
 "Best of 425", 425 Magazine, 2021

References

External links
 

Casinos completed in 2008
Buildings and structures in King County, Washington
Casinos in Washington (state)
Native American casinos